Michelangelo Faggioli (1666–1733) was an Italian lawyer and celebrated amateur composer of humorous cantatas in Neapolitan dialect. A founder of a new genre of Neapolitan comedy, he was the composer of the opera buffa La Cilla in 1706.

References

Italian Baroque composers
1666 births
1733 deaths
Italian male classical composers
18th-century Italian composers
18th-century Italian male musicians